Avatar Records is a Tel Aviv-based independent record label and digital distributor specializing in electronic music, providing music to online retailers including Apple Music, iTunes, Spotify and Beatport. The company was founded by Avichay Avigal and Peter Eibenschutz in 1997. The label initially had an alliance with NMC Music, when it first started as its subsidiary. Later, Avatar was in collaboration with BNE, before finally becoming a fully independent label.

Projects released on Avatar include albums from Asia 2001, Goa Gil, Nimba, The Nommos, Electric Universe, Toi Doi, Thomas Leer, Lumen, Ocelot, Pete Namlook & Mixmaster Morris, Jupiter 8000, Overdream, Enichkin, Celtic Cross, Becoming.Intense & Pharmacore, Prana, Sandman, GMS, Hux Flux, Orion, Indoor, The Infinity Project, Cydonia, Synchro, Sonic Scope, Psychoz, Astropilot, Elysium, Reflex. and more.

History

Early years: 1997 - 2003
During its first years, Avatar focused on releases from big names. Later, it became more interested in discovering new names. Names like Toi Doi, Overdream, Psychoz and Astropilot have all started with Avatar.

Avatar was the first label to release psychedelic trance music locally in India, Mexico and Poland.

Later years: 2004 - present
In 2004, Avatar had its entire catalogue available on The Orchard, and this remained so until the bankruptcy of BNE, and was followed by a lawsuit of Avatar against BNE.

In 2008, Avatar became a fully independent label, and signed a digital deal with Ingrooves/Fontana.

Notable releases
Asia 2001 - Ama Zone, the first Avatar release. Also released by Sony Music under Goa 2001, it was the first psychedelic trance release in India.
Thomas Leer - Conversation Peace (half of the duo Act with Claudia Brücken from Propaganda)
GMS - Chaos Laboratory 
X-Dream - We Created Our Own Happiness 
The Kumba Mela Experiment - East Of River Ganges album 
Retrodelic Vibes series, considered the unofficial bible of psytrance music
Goa Gil - Karmageddon
Toi Doi - Technologic
Indoor - Progressive Trance (the Beatles of Israeli trance) 
The Nommos - Emme Ya

Avatar Sublabels

Avatar Spirit
Avatar Spirit is the Chillout and Lounge label of Avatar. In addition it releases Yoga and Café  music from India, Morocco, The Middle East, Arabia and The Orient.

ProFile
The classics label of Avatar that features some of the best All Time favorite albums in psytrance and ambient. Releases from Goa Gil, Orion, Pete Namlook, Indoor, Sandman, Space Cat, The Infinity Project, Total Eclipse, Celtic Cross, GMS, X-Dream, Hux Flux, The Kumba Mela Experiment, and more

Trans'pact
Established in 1992 with its sub labels Doss House and Subliminal Records.

Past and present artists 
 Argyria
 Asia 2001
 Becoming.Intense
 Domino
 Electric Universe 
 Elysium
 Enichkin
 Goa Gil
 Jupiter 8000
 Thomas Leer
 Lumen 
 Nimba 
 The Nommos
 Ocelot
 Overdream
 Reflex
 Saint Janus
 Space Cat 
 Synchro
 Toi Doi

References

External links
 Avatar Records
 Avatar Records YouTube channel

Record labels established in 1997
Trance record labels